Ilesa West is a Local Government Area in Osun State, Nigeria. Its headquarter is located at  Omi Aladiye on the outskirts of the city of Ilesa.  Its chairman, as of 2019, is Giwa Nurudeen.

It has an area of  63 km and a population of 103,555 at the 2006 census.

The postal code of the area is 233.

References

Local Government Areas in Osun State